Gail A. Reed-Barnett (born May 28, 1955) is a career school counselor and former Brooklyn elected official.

Early life and education 
Reed-Barnett was born in the Bedford-Stuyvesant neighborhood of Brooklyn, New York, to parents William and Lillian Reed. She eventually moved and permanently relocated to the East Flatbush neighborhood of Brooklyn.

Reed-Barnett holds a B.A. in Psychology from Medgar Evers College, an MSEd from Long Island University in counseling and an Ed.D in Child, Youth and Family Studies from Nova Southeastern University.

Career 
Since 1996, Reed-Barnett has been a School Counselor/College Advisor at the New York City Department of Education.

From 2002 to 2006, she was New York State Committeewoman/District Leader for the 58th Assembly District.

From 2004 to 2006, Reed-Barnett was district leader of Brooklyn Community Board 17. From 2013 to 2015, she was and Chairperson of Brooklyn Community Board 17.

Leadership 
 Alumni Association of Medgar Evers College, Secretary and Second Vice President
 East 38th Street 2001 Block Association, President
 New York State School Counselor Association, Governor and Executive Board member
 Nova Southeastern University Alumni Association, Brooklyn Chapter, President

Honors 
In 2007, Reed-Barnett was honored by New York State Senator Edolphus Towns for her work in education and within the community.

In 2015, Reed-Barnett won a "Women of Distinction" award from the New York State Senate.

Personal life 
Reed-Barnett lives in the East Flatbush neighborhood of Brooklyn. She is married to her husband, Winston Barnett, who is a math teacher.

References

External links 
 

Living people
Politicians from Brooklyn
1955 births